Bognor Regis railway station is in the town of Bognor Regis, in the English county of West Sussex. It opened as the terminus of a short branch line in 1864, replacing a more distant station on the Worthing to Chichester main line. Like the town it served, it was known as Bognor until 1929. The junction on the main line is Barnham station, opened on the same day as the branch itself.

With the developing leisure traffic travelling to the resort, the opportunity was taken to provide a lavish and commodious station in 1902. Electrification followed in 1937 as part of the Portsmouth No. 2 Electrification scheme of the Southern Railway, and a frequent service of trains from London was provided.

The station is managed and serviced by Southern which is a Govia Thameslink Railway brand. The train service on the main line and the branch is known as the West Coastway Line.

History
It was opened on 8 June 1846 by the Brighton and Chichester Railway, which was absorbed into the London Brighton and South Coast Railway when that company was formed a few weeks later.

This original Bognor station was renamed Woodgate for Bognor in November 1846, and seems to have been erratically named in Bradshaw as Woodgate or Bognor. 

In 1845 a railway connection to Barnham from Guildford had been proposed, but that, and later proposed local lines in 1853 and 1855 foundered. Nevertheless it was obvious that without a railway connection, a community was at a severe disadvantage due to the high cost of transporting heavy materials, and local interests put forward a further scheme, which was authorised as the Bognor Railway, by Act of 11 July 1861.

The new branch line opened for traffic on 1 June 1864; a new station, called Barnham, was provided on the main line at the point of junction of the branch. There were no intermediate stations. The old Barnham (or Woodgate) station, together with Yapton station, nearby on the main line, closed. The new branch line was 3 miles 46 chains (5.75 km) in length, and was single track.

The station master at Woodgate had been a Mr Robinson; on his death in 1862, his daughter Miss Robinson had been employed in the booking office and continued until leaving on marrying, the following year. "She must have been one of the earliest women clerks on railways in Britain."

The Bognor Railway Company was independent of the LBSCR, but was absorbed by it in 1870.

Bognor station suffered partial destruction twice: it was blown down in a gale in 1897, and then burned down in 1899. The present station buildings by the company architect C.D. Collins date from 1902 and have achieved grade II listed building status as an Edwardian period seaside station terminus.

The line was doubled at the immediate area of Bognor station in 1902 to ease station working, from Bearsted Crossing, a distance of about 200 yards (180 m). The remainder of the branch was doubled on 30 July 1911; the work included the remodelling of the layout at Barnham to incorporate a double junction immediately west of the station, enabling direct running to and from the branch, which had not previously been possible.

Electrification
The electrification of the Mid-Sussex line and associated connections was known as the Portsmouth No 2 Electrification (after the Portsmouth Direct Line). A government loan at a cheap rate of interest was made available under the Railways (Agreement ) Act 1935. The electrification was on the third-rail direct current system already in use in the London suburban area and on the Portsmouth Direct Line. It comprised the route from Dorking to Horsham and onwards through Arundel to the coastal junction at Ford and on to Havant (for Portsmouth). The line from West Worthing to Ford was included, and the Littlehampton and Bognor Regis branches were covered. Barnham and Bognor Regis stations had their platforms extended to 820 feet (250 m) to enable 12-car trains to use them, and the layout at Barnham was altered to facilitate dividing and combing trains there. A new 66-lever frame was provided at Bognor Regis signalbox. New electrified berthing sidings were provided.

The official inauguration took place on 30 June 1938, and regular electric services commenced on 2nd July 1938. The normal fast train service to Bognor Regis from Victoria was via Sutton, Dorking and Horsham, dividing at Barnham. The front four-car unit detached and continued forward to Portsmouth, and the rear 8 cars (4-Buf + 4-Cor) ran to Bognor Regis. At peak times some London trains ran via Three Bridges, or to and from London Bridge.

Suffix Regis
The town was known simply as Bognor. In 1930 the town was renamed Bognor Regis, after King George V convalesced there in 1929, in recognition of the ambience, facilities and general well-being he enjoyed in and around the area.

Facilities
The station has a ticket office, car park, and 4 platforms in use: platforms 1 to 3 are 12 carriages in length whilst platform 4 is only 4 carriages long. The station has a small cafe and newspaper shop.

Services
All services at Bognor Regis are operated by Southern using  and  EMUs.

The typical off-peak service in trains per hour is:
 2 tph to  via 
 1 tph to 

On Sundays, the shuttle service to Barnham does not run and the service to London Victoria is reduced to hourly.

Accidents and incidents
 On 14 November 2008, a passenger train was derailed at the station during a period of resignalling and single line working due to a signaller's error.

 On 22 October 2020, Class 313 electric multiple unit 313212 was derailed at the station due to a signaller's error.

References

External links

Bognor Regis
Railway stations in West Sussex
Former London, Brighton and South Coast Railway stations
DfT Category D stations
Railway stations in Great Britain opened in 1864
Grade II listed buildings in West Sussex
Railway stations served by Govia Thameslink Railway